Two ships of the Royal Norwegian Navy have borne the name HNoMS Odin, after Odin, the primary god in Norse mythology:

 was a schooner built at Georgernes Verft in Bergen in 1808.
 a  launched in 1939 and captured by the Germans in 1940. Returned to Norway in 1945 and rebuilt as frigate in 1948.

Royal Norwegian Navy ship names